The O'Donnell House in Sumter, South Carolina, also known as Haynsworth-Bogin-O'Donnell House or as Shelley-Brunson Funeral Home, was built in 1840. It was listed on the National Register of Historic Places in 1996.

References

Houses on the National Register of Historic Places in South Carolina
Neoclassical architecture in South Carolina
Houses completed in 1840
Houses in Sumter County, South Carolina
National Register of Historic Places in Sumter County, South Carolina
1840 establishments in South Carolina